Amoral may refer to:
Amorality, the absence of morality; for example, a stone, a chair, or the sky may be considered amoral
Moral nihilism, the belief that the notion of morality is meaningless
Amoral (band), Finnish metal band